The Catholic Church in Ethiopia and Eritrea is joined in a single transnational episcopal conference which, also atypically, includes the Eastern Catholic (Coptic) churches, totaling of two metropolitan archeparchies, six diocesan suffragans (eparchies) and nine pre-diocesan Latin missionary jurisdictions (apostolic vicariates, except one apostolic prefecture). Each country also has an inter-Catholic national assembly.
 The Latin hierarchy is composed solely of the pre-diocesan missionary jurisdictions in Ethiopia.
 The Eastern Catholics have a Coptic (Alexandrian Rite) particular church sui iuris in each country (both using the Archaic Geez language), each headed by a metropolitan whose ecclesiastical province, covering that nation, is the whole church, with three suffragans each.

Furthermore, there is an Apostolic Nunciature to Ethiopia (papal embassy-level diplomatic representation) in the national capital Addis Abbeba; in it are also vested the Apostolic Nunciatures to Djibouti and to Somalia.The Apostolic Nunciature to Eritrea is vested in the Apostolic Nunciature to Sudan (in its capital Khartum)

Current jurisdictions

Latin Church 
all missionary and exempt, i.e. directly subject to the Holy See, and in Ethiopia
 Apostolic Vicariate of Awasa
 Apostolic Vicariate of Gambella
 Apostolic Vicariate of Harar
 Apostolic Vicariate of Hosanna
 Apostolic Vicariate of Jimma-Bonga
 Apostolic Vicariate of Meki
 Apostolic Vicariate of Nekemte
 Apostolic Vicariate of Soddo
 Apostolic Prefecture of Robe

Ethiopian Catholic Church 
Forming a single ecclesiastical province, constituting an Eastern Catholic particular church sui iuris using the Alexandrian Rite in the Ge'ez language.
 Metropolitan Archeparchy of Addis Abeba
Eparchy of Adigrat
Eparchy of Bahir Dar-Dessie
Eparchy of Emdeber

Eritrean Catholic Church 
Forming a single ecclesiastical province, constituting an Eastern Catholic particular church sui iuris using the Alexandrian Rite in the Ge'ez language.
 Metropolitan Archeparchy of Asmara
 Eparchy of Barentu
 Eparchy of Keren
 Eparchy of Segheneyti

Former jurisdictions 
(only in Ethiopia; not counting the former stages of current jurisdictions)

Titular sees 
 Titular Metropolitan See of Adulis
 Titular Episcopal See of Axomis

Suppressed jurisdictions 
 Latin Patriarchate of Ethiopia
 Apostolic Prefecture of Dessié
 Apostolic Prefecture of Endeber
 Apostolic Prefecture of Gondar

See also 
 Christianity in Ethiopia
 Christianity in Eritrea (previously part of Ethiopia)

Ethiopia
Catholic dioceses
Catholic dioceses